7Seventy7 is a 35 story apartment high rise commissioned by Milwaukee based Northwestern Mutual Life Insurance Company. The building was completed in 2018 and is located at 777 N. Van Buren St. in Milwaukee, Wisconsin.

History
Northwestern Mutual Life has stated that the building will have 310 luxury apartments along with 14 penthouse apartments and more than 1300 parking spaces. In 2016 Northwestern revised their plan and added another floor to make the building 35 floors. The estimated cost of the project was 100 million dollars and the expected completion date was the spring of 2018. The goal of the company was to make an apartment building that felt more like a hotel. The 35 story building was completed in August 2018 it boasts a golf simulator, an outdoor pool, a gym. The managing company (Bozzuto) is from Maryland. There are 24 floors of apartments and ten floors of parking.

Tenants

In 2019 Maurer’s (Madison Wisconsin based grocer) opened a 10,500 square foot grocery store called the Urban Market on the first floor of the building.
In 2020 the grocery store was closed and was replaced in 2022 with a fine dining restaurant.

See also
List of tallest buildings in Milwaukee

References

External links

Skyscraper office buildings in Milwaukee
Residential buildings completed in 2018
Residential skyscrapers in Milwaukee